Burchia semiinflata is a species of sea snail, a marine gastropod mollusk in the family Pseudomelatomidae.

Description
The length of the shell attains 45 mm.

Distribution
This species occurs in the Pacific Ocean off Redondo Beach, California, USA.

References

 Nautilus, vol. 52, 1938. pp. 21–22

External links
 
 

semiinflata
Gastropods described in 1931